Soka Gakkai International (SGI) is an international Nichiren Buddhist organisation founded in 1975 by Daisaku Ikeda, as an umbrella organization of Soka Gakkai, which claims approximately 12 million adherents in 192 countries and territories as of 2017, more than 1.5 million of whom resided outside of Japan as of 2012. It characterizes itself as a support network for practitioners of Nichiren Buddhism and a global Buddhist movement for "peace, education, and cultural exchange."

SGI is also a non-governmental organization (NGO) in consultative status with the United Nations Economic and Social Council since 1983.

History
The Soka Gakkai International (SGI) was formed at a conference on January 26, 1975, on the island of Guam. Representatives from 51 countries attended the meeting and chose Daisaku Ikeda, who served as third president of the Japanese Buddhist organization Soka Gakkai, to become the SGI's founding president. The SGI was created in part as a new international peace movement, and its founding meeting was held in Guam in a symbolic gesture referencing Guam's history as the site of some of World War II's bloodiest battles, and proximity to Tinian Island, launching place of the atomic bombs dropped on Hiroshima and Nagasaki, Japan.

The Soka Gakkai's initial global expansion began after World War II, when some Soka Gakkai members married mostly American servicemen and moved away from Japan. Expansion efforts gained a further boost in 1960 when Ikeda succeeded Jōsei Toda as president of the Soka Gakkai. In the first year of his presidency, Ikeda visited the United States, Canada, and Brazil, and the Soka Gakkai's first American headquarters officially opened in Los Angeles in 1963.

In 2000, Uruguay honored the 25th anniversary of the SGI's founding with a commemorative postage stamp. The stamp was issued on October 2, the anniversary of SGI President Ikeda's first overseas journey in 1960.

In January 2015, the director of the Peace Research Institute Oslo reported that the SGI had been nominated for the 2015 Nobel Peace Prize, as confirmed by a Nobel Peace Laureate.

In May 2015, the SGI-USA was one of the organizing groups for the first-ever Buddhist conference at the White House.

In June 2015, the SGI-Italy was recognized by the Italian government with a special accord under Italian Constitution Article 8, acknowledging it as an official religion of Italy and eligible to receive direct taxpayer funding for its religious and social activities. It also recognizes the Soka Gakkai as a "Concordat" (It: "Intesa") that grants the  religions status in "a special 'club' of denominations consulted by the government in certain occasions, allowed to appoint chaplains in the army a concordat is not needed for appointing chaplains in hospitals and jails and, perhaps more importantly, to be partially financed by taxpayers' money." Twelve other religious denominations share this status.

Organization
The Soka Gakkai International comprises a global network of affiliated organizations. As of 2011, the SGI reported active national organizations in 192 countries and territories with a total of approximately 12 million members. The SGI is independent of the Soka Gakkai (the domestic Japanese organization), although both are headquartered in Tokyo.

National SGI organizations operate autonomously and all affairs are conducted in the local language. Many national organizations are coordinated by groups such as a women's group, a men's group, and young women's and young men's groups. National organizations generally raise their own operational funds, although the SGI headquarters in Tokyo has awarded funding grants to smaller national organizations for projects such as land acquisition and the construction of new buildings. SGI-affiliated organizations outside Japan are forbidden to engage directly in politics.

While the national organizations are run autonomously, the Tokyo headquarters of SGI disseminates doctrinal and teaching materials to all national organizations around the world. The Tokyo headquarters also serves as a meeting place for national leaders to come together and exchange information and ideas.

The election or nomination of leaders is typically not decided by the SGI's general membership but by a board of directors. Leadership below national staff, however, has been liberalized; in the United States for instance, the nomination and approval of leaders includes both members and organizational leaders in the process. Author Karel Dobbelaere notes the election of the presidents, as well as a process of "nomination, review and approval that involves both peers and leaders" in choosing other leaders.

Beliefs and social engagement

SGI members adhere to the philosophy of Nichiren Buddhism as interpreted and applied by the Soka Gakkai's first three presidents Tsunesaburo Makiguchi, Josei Toda and Daisaku Ikeda, incorporating social interaction and engagement into their Buddhist practice. Monthly neighborhood discussion meetings are generally held at the homes of SGI members.

Soka Gakkai Malaysia since 2005 has held a non-competitive biennial "Run for Peace" to raise awareness of nuclear disarmament and in support of culture of peace in the community—reportedly "the largest peace run in the country held in 28 locations nationwide and involving some 115,000 runners."

In Dubai, the SGI Gulf association has hosted since 2008 an annual "Poetic Heart" symposium, partnering with other organizations and involving international and local artists as well as poets of all ages.

Organizational practices in the United States have been characterized as socially inclusive Buddhism. In 2008, the SGI-USA, which is headquartered in California, publicly opposed that state's Proposition 8 (which sought to prevent same-sex marriage), and coordinated with other progressive religious groups to support same-sex couples' right to legally marry.

In 2012, then-President of the Republic of China Ma Ying-jeou remarked that the Taiwan Soka Association had been recognized for its involvement the past 16 years in the general welfare of society, education and religious teaching, highlighting its disaster rescue and relief efforts in the wake of Typhoon Morakot in 2009.

In November 2019, the Soka Gakkai Peace Committee in Japan helped organize the international conference "No Justice Without Life," at which Mario Marazziti of the Italy-based Community of Sant'Egidio, among others, advocated for a moratorium on the death penalty. The Italian Buddhist Institute Soka Gakkai had earlier endorsed the Community of Sant'Egidio's international appeal "Moratorium 2000," which was launched in 1998.

Demographics

The Soka Gakkai International is notable among Buddhist organizations for the racial and ethnic diversity of its members. It has been characterized as the world's largest and most ethnically diverse Buddhist group. Professor Susumu Shimazono suggested several reasons for this: the strongly felt needs of individuals in their daily lives, its solutions to discord in interpersonal relations, its practical teachings that offer concrete solutions for carrying on a stable social life, and its provision of a place where congenial company and a spirit of mutual support may be found. Peter Clarke wrote that the SGI appeals to non-Japanese in part because "no one is obliged to abandon their native culture or nationality in order to fully participate in the spiritual and cultural life of the movement."

In 2015, Italian newspaper la Repubblica reported that half of all Buddhists in Italy are SGI members.

Initiatives promoting peace, culture and education

According to Yoichi Kawada, director of the Tokyo-based Institute of Oriental Philosophy, the SGI defines itself as a "movement for contributing to peace, culture and education" based on its "interpretation and practical application of the ideas in the Lotus Sutra." SGI engagement as a religious NGO affiliated with the United Nations in policy discussions on issues including human rights, sustainable development and peace building is similarly described, in the phrasing of its Charter, as contributing to peace, culture and education.

Nuclear disarmament
Since 2007, the SGI has collaborated closely with the International Campaign to Abolish Nuclear Weapons (ICAN) to develop educational programs and raise awareness on nuclear disarmament, particularly among young people. The SGI also partnered with ICAN to promote the Treaty on the Prohibition of Nuclear Weapons, which was adopted at the United Nations in July 2017, and for which ICAN was awarded the 2017 Nobel Peace Prize. Beatrice Fihn, executive director of ICAN, stated in a July 2017 interview that the "SGI has been one of our greatest partners in the fight to abolish nuclear weapons."

To further increase public awareness of the anti-nuclear movement, the SGI also created "The People's Decade" campaign, which since 2007 has developed a global grassroots network of people dedicated to abolishing nuclear weapons. In 2014, an SGI youth delegation met with the United Nations Office for Disarmament Affairs (UNODA) regarding coordination of the SGI's efforts and the UN efforts to increase grassroots movements for nuclear abolition.

In 2008, then-High Representative for Disarmament Affairs Sergio Duarte characterized SGI's work toward nuclear disarmament as linking human security with the fundamental goal of eliminating nuclear weapons.

According to Pax Christi International, on March 28, 2017, a joint statement of Faith Communities Concerned about Nuclear Weapons, initiated by the SGI, was delivered by Pax Christi Philippines during the first UN negotiating conference for the treaty to prohibit nuclear weapons. More than 20 religious leaders affirmed through the joint statement their shared "aspirations for peace and for a world where people live without fear," praising world leaders in attendance for "the courage to begin these negotiations" and calling on States not in attendance to join the June–July session of the conference.

Environmental awareness
The SGI also promotes environmental initiatives through educational activities such as exhibitions, lectures and conferences, and more direct activities such as tree planting projects and the SGI's Amazon Ecological Conservation Center, which is administered by SGI-Brazil. The center is engaged in reforestation, the creation of a regional seed bank, and experiments in sustainable agroforestry.

One scholar cites Daisaku Ikeda, SGI's president, describing such initiatives as a Buddhist-based impetus for direct public engagement in parallel with legal efforts to address environmental concerns.

In India, the Bharat Soka Gakkai (the SGI of India) debuted the traveling exhibit "Seeds of Hope," a joint initiative of the SGI and Earth Charter International. At the exhibit's opening in Panaji, the state capital of Goa, regional planning head Edgar Ribeiro spoke of lagging efforts to implement environmental laws and stated that "Only a people's movement can take sustainability forward." In Malaysia, Tunku Abdul Rahman University College President Datuk Dr Tan Chik Heok said that this exhibition helped "to create the awareness of the power of a single individual in bringing about waves of positive change to the environment, as well as the society."

In November 2015, the SGI signed on to the Buddhist Climate Change Statement representing "over a billion Buddhists worldwide" in a call to action submitted to world leaders at the 21st session of UN climate change talks held in Paris. The statement affirms that Buddhist spirituality compels environmental protection and expresses solidarity with Catholic and Muslim leaders who have taken a similar stance. Described as "one of the most unified calls by a religion's leadership," the statement draws on the 2009 pan-Buddhist statement, "The Time to Act is Now: A Buddhist Declaration on Climate Change," to which SGI-USA among others became a signatory in early 2015.

Aid work
The SGI conducts humanitarian aid projects in disaster-stricken regions. After the 2011 earthquake and tsunami in Japan, local Soka Gakkai facilities became refugee shelters and distribution centers for relief supplies. Efforts also included worldwide fundraising for the victims, youth groups, and spiritual support.

In 2014, SGI-Chile members collected supplies to deliver to emergency services and refugee centers after that country's devastating Iquique earthquake.

Interfaith dialogue
In 2015, SGI-USA was part of the organizing committee that convened a day-long conference in Washington, DC of 125 Buddhist leaders to discuss Buddhism and civic activism in the United States. The conference identified climate change and the environment, education and peace and disarmament as popular priorities.

Notable members
Notable members of the Soka Gakkai International include:

 Adewale Akinnuoye-Agbaje British-Nigerian actor best known for his roles on television, including Lost, Oz, and Game of Thrones
 Angelica Ross - American first transgender actress to be cast in a Broadway leading role and founder of the TransTech Social Enterprises, also known from TV series Pose and American Horror Story
 Anne Louise Hassing Danish actress, best known from her roles in movies such as The Idiots and The Hunt
 Belinda Carlisle American singer, member of the Rock and Roll Hall of Fame best known as the lead singer of The Go-Go's
 Betty Faria - Brazilian actress, best known for the lead role in the soap opera Tieta, and Gramado Film Festival winner for Anjos do Arrabalde.
 Beverly Glenn-Copeland U.S.-born Canadian musician, songwriter and singer 
 Boy George English singer, songwriter, DJ, fashion designer, mixed media artist, photographer and record producer
 Buster Williams American jazz bassist
 Carmen Consoli Italian singer and songwriter who sold two million albuns in Italy
 Celeste Lecesne American actor and writer of the Oscar-winning film Trevor, co-founder of The Trevor Project
 Cheryl Boone Isaacs American film executive and the first African-American president of the Academy of Motion Picture Arts and Sciences
 Christine Rankin Former head of the New Zealand Ministry of Social Development and politician
 Claire Bertschinger British nurse whose work inspired the formation of Live Aid and Band Aid and was named a dame by Queen Elizabeth II for "serving to Nurse and to International Humanitarian Aid"
 Claudia Jessie British actress, best known from the TV series Bridgerton
 Courtney Love American musician, songwriter, actress, and artist, she is known as the lead singer from Hole and for her roles in movies like The People vs. Larry Flynt and Man on the Moon, and was also nominated for four Grammy Awards and a Golden Globe
 Craig Taro Gold American best-selling author, entrepreneur, actor, singer-songwriter, producer, and philanthropist
 David Bennett Cohen blues musician
 Duncan Sheik American Grammy Awards nominated singer-songwriter and composer
 Hank Johnson United States Congressman for Georgia's 4th congressional district
 Hayley Mills English actress, best known for performances in movies such as Tiger Bay and Pollyanna, who received a Disney Legends Award and won a BAFTA and a Golden Globe
 Herbie Hancock American jazz pianist, keyboardist, bandleader, and composer who won 14 Grammy Awards and an Oscar
 Hisashi Iwakuma Major League Baseball player, pitcher for the Seattle Mariners
 Howard Jones English musician, singer and songwriter who had top ten 40 hit singles in the United Kingdom
 Isabela Garcia  - Brazilian actress known for her work on television soap operas, she was called "the Brazilian Shirley Temple" on her youth.
 John Astin American actor best known for playing Gomez Addams on The Addams Family
 Letícia Colin - Brazilian actress, nominated for the International Emmy Award for Best Actress for her role in the series Onde Está Meu Coração
 Marcia Wallace - American actress, voice artist and comedian, who won an Emmy Awards for The Simpsons
 Mariane Pearl French freelance journalist and former columnist and reporter, also known from the memoir A Mighty Heart
 Néstor Torres American jazz flautist
 Nick Jago British drummer known for being a former member of Black Rebel Motorcycle Club
 Orlando Bloom British actor and UNICEF Goodwill Ambassador known for his roles in film, including Pirates of the Caribbean trilogy, The Lord of the Rings trilogy, and Troy
 Orlando Cepeda American former Major League Baseball first baseman and member of the Hall of Fame
 Patrick Duffy American actor best known for his roles on television, including Dallas and Step by Step
 Roberto Baggio Italian footballer and member of the FIFA World Cup Dream Team
 Sabina Guzzanti Italian satirist, actress, and writer
 Selma Sueli Silva  Brazillian author, internet celebrity and radio personality known for her books and podcasts about autism in adult women, such as Vozes da Maturidade, TransParente, Camaleônicos and Minha vida de trás pra frente
 Shan Serafin American film director, screenwriter and novelist
 Shunsuke Nakamura Japanese soccer player, midfielder for the Scottish team Celtic F.C.
 Sophia Mendonça  Brazillian author and internet celebrity, best known as one of the first content creators in her country to produce works starring autistic people for her books such as Outro Olhar and Metamorfoses and YouTube channel Mundo Autista
 Steven Sater American playwright, lyricist and screenwriter best known for the Tony-winning musical Spring Awakening
 Suzanne Vega American folk singer-songwriter
 Tina Turner American singer, dancer, actress, and author, who sold over 100 million records worldwide and received 12 Grammy Awards 
 Vinessa Shaw American actress, best known from her roles in films such as Hocus Pocus and Side Effects
 Wayne Shorter American jazz saxophonist and composer, who won 11 Grammy Awards

References

Further reading
 Causton, Richard: The Buddha in Daily Life: An Introduction to the Buddhism of Nichiren Daishonin. Rider, 1995;  
Dobbelaere, Karel: Soka Gakkai: From Lay Movement to Religion. Signature Books, 2001; 
 Seager, Richard: Encountering the Dharma: Daisaku Ikeda, Soka Gakkai, and the Globalization of Buddhist Humanism. University of California Press, 2006; 
 Strand, Clark: Waking the Buddha: How the Most Dynamic and Empowering Buddhist Movement in History Is Changing Our Concept of Religion. Middleway Press, 2014;

External links
Official SGI websites
 
 SGI Office for UN Affairs  SGI website on its NGO consultative work with the United Nations
 People's Decade for Nuclear Abolition II SGI website supporting the Treaty on the Prohibition of Nuclear Weapons
 Common Threads SGI blog supporting a culture of peace
 sgi.org/ru Official SGI website in the Russian language

International Buddhist organizations
Buddhist charities
Organizations based in Tokyo
Organizations established in 1975
Peace organizations based in Japan
Religious organizations based in Japan
Religious organizations established in 1975
Soka Gakkai
1975 establishments in Guam
International Campaign to Abolish Nuclear Weapons